Konstantinos Papoutsis (born 31 March 1979) is a Greek footballer.

Career
Born in Athens, Papoutsis began playing professional football with Greek third division side Kerkyra in 1997. He also played for Egaleo in the Greek Super League.

References

External links
Profile at Onsports.gr

1983 births
Living people
A.O. Kerkyra players
Panetolikos F.C. players
Egaleo F.C. players
Panachaiki F.C. players
Kalamata F.C. players
Association football defenders
Footballers from Athens
Greek footballers